Solariella patriae is a species of sea snail, a marine gastropod mollusk in the family Solariellidae.

Description
The size of the shell attains 9 mm.

Distribution
This species occurs in the Atlantic Ocean off Eastern Brazil and Argentina at depths between 15 m and 180 m.

References

 Carcelles, A. R. 1953. Nuevas especies de gastropodos marinos de las republicas oriental del Uruguay y Argentina. Comunicaciones Zoologicas del Museo de Historia Natural de Montevideo 4(70): 1-16, 5 pls

External links
 To Biodiversity Heritage Library (1 publication)
 To Encyclopedia of Life
 To World Register of Marine Species

patriae
Gastropods described in 1953